Ostojićevo is a village in Serbia. It is situated in the Čoka municipality, North Banat District, Vojvodina province. The village has a Serb ethnic majority (56.15%) with a present Hungarian minority (26.51%) and its population numbering 2,844 people. The village also has a Polish minority of about 300 people, of Cieszyn Silesian (mostly from Wisła) descent (2002 census).

Name
In Serbian the village is known as Ostojićevo (Остојићево), in Hungarian as Tiszaszentmiklós, in Slovak as Ostojičovo, in Croatian as Ostojićevo, and in German as Sankt Nikolaus an der Theiß.

Historical population

1961: 4,024
1971: 3,678
1981: 3,395
1991: 3,040

See also
List of places in Serbia
List of cities, towns and villages in Vojvodina

References
Slobodan Ćurčić, Broj stanovnika Vojvodine, Novi Sad, 1996.

Gallery

Populated places in Serbian Banat
Čoka